Macon, officially Macon–Bibb County, is a consolidated city-county in the U.S. state of Georgia.

Macon’s population was 157,346 in 2020. It is the principal city of the Macon Metropolitan Statistical Area, which had 234,802 people in 2020. It also is the largest city in the Macon–Warner Robins Combined Statistical Area (CSA), which had approximately 420,693 residents in 2017 and abuts the Atlanta metropolitan area to the northwest. 

Voters approved the consolidation of the City of Macon and Bibb County governments in a 2012 referendum. Macon became the state’s fourth-largest city after Augusta when the merger occurred January 1, 2014.

Macon is served by three interstate highways: I-16 (connecting to Savannah and coastal Georgia), I-75 (connecting to Atlanta to the north and Valdosta to the south), and I-475 (a city bypass highway). The area has two airports: Middle Georgia Regional Airport and Herbert Smart Downtown Airport.

The city has several institutions of higher education and numerous museums and tourism sites.

History
Macon was founded on the site of the Ocmulgee Old Fields, where the Creek Indians lived in the 18th century. Their predecessors, the Mississippian culture, built a powerful agriculture-based chiefdom (950–1100 AD). The Mississippian culture constructed earthwork mounds for ceremonial, religious, and burial purposes. Indigenous peoples inhabited the areas along the Southeast’s rivers for 13,000 years before Europeans arrived.

Macon was developed at the site of Fort Benjamin Hawkins, built in 1809 at President Thomas Jefferson’s direction after he forced the Creek to cede their lands east of the Ocmulgee River (Archeological excavations in the 21st century found evidence of two separate fortifications.) The fort was named for Benjamin Hawkins, who served as Superintendent of Indian Affairs for the Southeast territory south of the Ohio River for more than 20 years, had lived among the Creek, and was married to a Creek woman. Located at the fall line of the Ocmulgee River, the fort established a trading post with Native peoples at river’s most inland point navigable from the Low Country. 

Fort Hawkins guarded the Lower Creek Pathway, an extensive and well-traveled American Indian network that the U.S. government later improved as the Federal Road, linking Washington, D.C., to the ports of Mobile, Alabama and New Orleans, Louisiana. Used for trading with the Creek, the fort also was used by state militia and federal troops. It was a major military distribution point during the War of 1812 and the Creek War of 1813. After the wars, it was a trading post and garrisoned troops until 1821. Decommissioned around 1828, it later burned to the ground. A replica of the southeast blockhouse was built in 1938 and stands on an east Macon hill.  Fort Hawkins Grammar School occupied part of the site.  In the 21st century, archeological excavations have revealed more of the fort, increasing its historical significance, and led to further reconstruction planning for this major historical site.

With the arrival of more settlers, Fort Hawkins was renamed "Newtown." After Bibb County's organization in 1822, the city was  chartered as the county seat in 1823 and officially named Macon, in honor of Nathaniel Macon, a statesman from North Carolina, where  many early Georgia residents hailed. City planners envisioned "a city within a park" and created a city of spacious streets and landscapes. Over  were dedicated for Central City Park, and ordinances required residents to plant shade trees in their front yards.

Because of the beneficial local Black Belt geology and enslaved African American labor, cotton became the mainstay of Macon's early economy. The city's location on the Ocmulgee River aided initial economic expansion, providing shipping access to new markets. Cotton steamboats, stagecoaches, and the 1843 arrival of the railroad increased marketing opportunities and contributed to Macon's  economic prosperity. 

Macon's growth had other benefits. In 1836, the Georgia Conference of the Methodist Episcopal Church chose Macon as the location for Wesleyan College, the first U.S. college to grant women college degrees. Nonetheless, Macon came in last in the 1855 referendum voting to be Georgia's capital city with 3,802 votes.

During the American Civil War, Macon served as the official arsenal of the Confederacy manufacturing percussion caps, friction primers, and pressed bullets. Camp Oglethorpe was established as a prison for captured Union officers and enlisted men. Later,  it held only officers, at one time numbering 2,300. The camp was evacuated in 1864.

Macon City Hall served as the temporary state capitol in 1864 and was converted to a hospital for wounded Confederate soldiers. The Union General William Tecumseh Sherman spared Macon on his march to the sea. His troops sacked the nearby state capital of Milledgeville, and Maconites prepared for an attack. Sherman, however, passed by without entering Macon.

The Macon Telegraph reported the city had furnished 23 companies of men for the Confederacy, but casualties were high. By war end, Maconite survivors fit for duty could only fill five companies.

The city was taken by Union forces during Wilson's Raid on April 20, 1865.

Because of its central location, Macon developed as a state transportation hub. In 1895, the New York Times dubbed Macon "The Central City” because of is emergence as a railroad transportation and textile factory hub.  Terminal Station was built in 1916. In the twentieth century, Macon grew into a prospering town in Middle Georgia. 

Macon has been impacted by natural catastrophes. In 1994 Tropical Storm Alberto made landfall in Florida and flooded several Georgia cities. Macon, which received  of rain, suffered major flooding in Georgia.

On May 11, 2008, an EF2 tornado hit Macon. Touching down in nearby Lizella, the tornado moved northeast to the southern shore of Lake Tobesofkee, continued into Macon, and lifted near Dry Branch in Twiggs County. The tornado produced sporadic areas of major damage, with widespread straight-line wind damage along its southern track. The most significant damage was along Eisenhower Parkway and Pio Nono Avenue in Macon, where two businesses were destroyed and several others were heavily damaged. The tornado also impacted Middle Georgia State College, where almost half of the campus’s trees were snapped or uprooted and several buildings were damaged, with the gymnasium suffering the worst. The tornado’s intensity varied from EF0 to EF2, with the EF2 damage and winds up to  occurring near the intersection of Eisenhower Parkway and Pio Nono Avenue.

Consolidation

On July 31, 2012, voters in Macon (57.8 percent approval) and Bibb County (56.7 percent approval) passed a referendum to merge the governments of the city of Macon and most of unincorporated Bibb County. The vote came after the Georgia General Assembly passed House Bill 1171, authorizing the referendum earlier in the year; Four previous consolidation attempts (in 1933, 1960, 1972, and 1976) failed.

As a result of the referendum, (i) the Macon and Bibb County governments were replaced with a mayor and a nine-member county commission elected by districts and (ii) a portion of Macon extending into nearby Jones County was disincorporated. Robert Reichert was elected the first mayor of Macon-Bibb in the September 2013 election, which required a runoff with C. Jack Ellis in October.

Timeline

 1806 - U.S. Fort Hawkins built at the present-day site of Creek Indian Ocmulgee Old Fields (future site of Macon).
 1821 - Fort Hawkins settlement renamed "Newtown."
 1822 - Bibb County created.
 1823 - Town of Macon incorporated; named after North Carolina statesman Nathaniel Macon.
 1826
 Macon Telegraph newspaper begins publication.
 First Presbyterian Church founded.
 1829 - Newtown becomes part of Macon.
 1833 - Steamboat in operation.
 1834 - City of Macon incorporated.
 1835 - Robert Augustus Beall elected mayor.
 1836 - Monroe Railroad Bank built.
 1838 - Monroe Railroad (Forsyth-Macon) begins operating.
 1839 - Georgia Female College opens.
 1840
 Rose Hill Cemetery established.
 Population: 3,927.
 1843 - The Central of Georgia Railway connects Savannah and Macon.
 1846 - The Macon and Western Railroad connects Macon and Atlanta; the Small House (residence) built (approximate date).
 1848 - Telegraph begins operating.
 1851 - Georgia State Fair relocates to Macon.
 1860
 Belgian Fair and Cotton Planters' Exposition held.
 Population: 8,247.
 1862 - "Arsenal of the Confederate Government moved to Macon" during the American Civil War.
 1864
 July 30: Macon besieged by Union forces.
 "City Hall made temporary State Capitol of Georgia."
 1865 - April 20: Macon occupied by Union forces.
 1866 - October 29: Equal Rights and Educational Association of Georgia meeting held in Macon.
 1871
 Mercer University relocates to Macon from Penfield.
 Bibb Manufacturing Company in business.
 1874 - Public Library (social library) established.
 1876 - Mount de Sales Academy active.
 1880
 Telephone begins operating.
 Population: 12,749.
 1884
 Macon Daily News begins publication.
 Academy of Music built.
 1887
 April 6: Riverside Cemetery chartered
 August 6: Woolfolk family murdered near Macon.
 1900 - Price Library (public library) opens.
 1906 - Ocmulgee River levee construction begins.
 1910 - Population: 40,665.
 1917 - Cox Capitol Theatre in business.
 1918
 National Association for the Advancement of Colored People Columbus branch organized (approximate date).
 Macon Art Association formed.
 Outbreak of Spanish flu.
 1919
 Washington Memorial Library (public library) established.
 Paul Jones was lynched on November 2, 1919, after being accused of attacking a fifty-year-old white woman. He was burned alive.
 1921 - Douglass Theatre and Rialto Theatre in business.
 1922
 WMAZ radio begins broadcasting.
 Sherah Israel Synagogue built.
 1925 - Macon City Auditorium built.
 1929 - Luther Williams Field (stadium) opens.
 1929 - Walker Business College, an African American business and vocational school opens a second campus in Macon
 1933 - Citizens & Southern National Bank building constructed.
 1936
 Ocmulgee National Monument established.
 Farmer's Market built.
 1938 - Bibb Theatre in business.
 1948 - WIBB radio begins broadcasting.
 1949 - Middle Georgia Regional Library headquartered in Macon.
 1950 - Population: 70,252.
 1952 - Georgia Journal newspaper begins publication.
 1953 - WMAZ-TV begins broadcasting.
 1955 - "Singer James Brown records his first single 'Please Please Please' at the studio of WIBB" radio in Macon.
 1960 - "Stratford Academy founded"
 1964 - Middle Georgia Historical Society formed.
 1965 - Macon Junior College established.
 1966 - U.S. Supreme Court decides Evans v. Newton desegregation-related lawsuit.
 1967
 December 18: Funeral of musician Otis Redding.
 Ronnie Thompson becomes mayor.
 1970 - Population: 122,423.
 1978 - Middle Georgia Archives organized.
 1983
 Cherry Blossom Festival begins.
 Richard Ray becomes U.S. representative for Georgia's 3rd congressional district.
 1993 - Sanford Bishop becomes U.S. representative for Georgia's 2nd congressional district.
 1994
 July: Flood.
 Georgia Sports Hall of Fame relocates to Macon.
 1999 - C. Jack Ellis becomes mayor.
 2000 - Population: 97,255.
 2001 - City website online (approximate date).
 2003 - Historic Macon Foundation formed.
 2007 - Robert Reichert becomes mayor.
 2010 - Population: 91,351.
 2012 - Governments of Macon city and Bibb County consolidated.
 2015 - Middle Georgia State University active.

Geography

The Ocmulgee River is a major river that runs through the city. Macon is one of Georgia's three major Fall Line Cities, along with Augusta and Columbus. The Fall Line is where the hilly lands of the Piedmont plateau meet the flat terrain of the coastal plain. As such, Macon has a varied landscape of rolling hills on the north side and flat plains on the south. The fall line, where the altitude drops noticeably, causes rivers and creeks in the area to flow rapidly toward the ocean.  In the past, Macon and other Fall Line cities had many textile mills powered by the rivers.

Macon is located at  (32.834839, −83.651672).

Climate
Macon has a humid subtropical climate (Köppen climate classification Cfa). On average, there are 4.8 days with + highs, 83 days with + highs, and 43 days with a low at or below freezing; the average window for freezing temperatures is November 7 thru March 22, allowing a growing season of 228 days.

Surrounding cities and towns

Demographics

Macon is the largest principal city in the Macon-Warner Robins-Fort Valley CSA, a Combined Statistical Area that includes the Macon metropolitan area (Bibb, Crawford, Jones, Monroe, and Twiggs counties) and the Warner Robins metropolitan area (Houston, Peach, and Pulaski counties) with a combined population of 411,898 in the 2010 census.

As of the official 2010 U.S. Census, the population of Macon was 91,351. In the last official census, in 2000, there were 97,255 people, 38,444 households, and 24,219 families residing in the city. The racial makeup of the city was 67.94% African American, 28.56% White, 0.02% Native American, 0.65% Asian, 0.03% Pacific Islander, 0.46% from other races, and 0.77% from two or more races. Hispanic or Latino people of any race were 2.48% of the population.

There were 38,444 households, out of which 30.1% had children under the age of 18 living with them, 33.0% were married couples living together, 25.7% had a female householder with no husband present, and 37.0% were non-families. 31.7% of all households were made up of individuals, and 12.1% had someone living alone who was 65 years of age or older.  The average household size was 2.44 and the average family size was 3.08.

In the city, the population was spread out, with 26.9% under the age of 18, 11.3% from 18 to 24, 27.5% from 25 to 44, 20.0% from 45 to 64, and 14.3% who were 65 years of age or older.  The median age was 34 years. For every 100 females, there were 79.7 males.  For every 100 females aged 18 and over, there were 72.8 males.

Economy

Personal income
The 2010 Census listed Macon’s median household income as $28,366, below the state average of $49,347. The median family income was $37,268. Full-time working males had a median income of $34,163, higher than the $28,082 for females. About 24.1% of families and 30.6% of the population were below the poverty line, including 43.6% of those under age 18 and 18.4% of those over 65.

Retail

Malls include The Shoppes at River Crossing, Macon Mall, and Eisenhower Crossing. Traditional shopping centers are in the downtown area and Ingleside Village.

Military
Macon is the headquarters of the 48th Infantry Brigade Combat Team, Georgia Army National Guard. 

The largest single-site industrial complex in Georgia, Robins Air Force Base, is 10 miles south of Macon on Highway 247, just east of Warner Robins.

Arts and culture

Musical heritage
Macon has been home for numerous musicians and composers, including Emmett Miller, The Allman Brothers Band, Randy Crawford, Mark Heard, Lucille Hegamin, Ben Johnston, Otis Redding, Little Richard, Mike Mills, and Bill Berry of R.E.M., as well as more recent artists like violinist Robert McDuffie and country artist Jason Aldean. Capricorn Records, run by Macon natives Phil Walden and briefly Alan Walden, made the city a Southern rock music production center in the late 1960s and 1970s.

The Macon Symphony Orchestra, a youth symphony, and the Middle Georgia Concert Band perform at the Grand Opera House in downtown Macon.

The Georgia Music Hall of Fame was located in Macon from 1996 to 2011.

Festivals

 International Cherry Blossom Festival - a 10-day celebration held every mid-March in Macon
 The Mulberry Street Festival - an arts and crafts festival held downtown the last weekend of March
The Juneteenth Freedom Festival - An annual June performing arts and educational celebration of the end of American slavery in 1865, celebrating black freedom and heritage both ancient and contemporary
 Pan African Festival - An annual celebration of the African diaspora and culture, held in April
 Ocmulgee Indian Celebration - A celebration of the original residents of the land where Macon now sits, this festival is held in September  at Ocmulgee Mounds National Historical Park. Representatives from the Cherokee, Chickasaw, Choctaw, Creek, Seminole, and other nations come to share stories, exhibit Native art, and perform traditional songs and dance.
 Skydog is a music festival celebrating the birthday, life, and music of Skydog (Duane Allman) held in November.
 The Georgia Music Hall of Fame hosts Georgia Music Week in September.
 Macon's annual Bragg Jam festival features an Art and Kids' Festival along the Ocmulgee Heritage Trail and a nighttime Pub Crawl.
 Macon Film Festival - an annual celebration of independent films, held the third weekend in July

Points of interest

Historical sites
 Terminal Station, a railroad station built in 1916, is located on 5th St. at the end of Cherry St.  Its architect was Alfred Fellheimer, prominent for his 1903 design of Grand Central Terminal in New York City. 
 Ocmulgee Mounds National Historical Park is located near downtown Macon. It preserves some of Georgia’s largest ancient earthwork mounds built by the Mississippian culture a millennium ago, c. 950–1150. It was sacred to the historic Muscogee (Creek Nation) as well. Archeological artifacts reveal 13,000 years of human habitation at the site. The park features a spiral mound, funeral mound, temple mounds, burial mounds, and a reconstructed earth lodge. It is the first Traditional Cultural Property designated by the National Park Service east of the Mississippi River.
 Fort Benjamin Hawkins, a major military outpost (1806-1821), was a command headquarters for the U.S. Army and Georgia militia on the boundary between U.S.-held and Native land, as well as a trading post or factory for the Creek Nation. It was a supply depot during U.S. campaigns of the War of 1812 and the Creek and Seminole Wars.
 Cannonball House, a historic home on the National Register of Historic Places.
 Luther Williams Field
 Old City Cemetery, one of Macon's oldest cemeteries
 Rose Hill Cemetery, a cemetery listed on the National Register of Historic Places
 Sidney Lanier Cottage, the poet’s historic home. 
 Temple Beth Israel, a domed Neoclassical built in 1902 to house Macon’s Jewish congregation, founded in 1859.
 Wesleyan College, the first chartered women's college in the world

Museums
 The Allman Brothers Band Museum - the "Big House" used by the Allman Brothers Band in the early 1970s, now a museum of Allman Brothers history and artifacts
 The Georgia Children's Museum - interactive education, located in the downtown Museum District
 Georgia Sports Hall of Fame
 The Little Richard House and Museum - a museum of Little Richard's history and artifacts
 Museum of Arts and Sciences and Planetarium
 Tubman Museum of African American Art, History, and Culture - the largest African American museum in the Southeast

Community
 City Hall, Georgia's capital for part of the Civil War

 Douglass Theatre, named for its founder Charles Henry Douglas. An entrepreneur from a prominent black family, he was an established theatre developer well versed in the vaudeville and entertainment business. The theatre has undergone modern renovations and hosts numerous theatrical events.
 The Grand Opera House, where the Macon Symphony Orchestra performs
 Hay House - also known as the "Johnston-Felton-Hay House," it has  been referred to as the "Palace of the South"
 City Auditorium, the world's largest true copper dome
 Macon Coliseum
 Macon Little Theatre, established in 1934, is the area's oldest community theatre, producing seven plays/musicals per season
 Waddell Barnes Botanical Gardens
 Theatre Macon, in the old Ritz Theatre; they perform around nine shows a year

Sports
Macon is home to the Mercer Bears, with NCAA Division I teams in soccer (men's and women's), football, baseball, basketball (men's and women's), tennis, and lacrosse. Central Georgia Technical College competes in men's and women's basketball. Wesleyan College, a women’s school, has basketball, soccer, cross country, tennis, softball, and volleyball teams.

Former teams

Parks and recreation
The city maintains several parks and community centers.

Ocmulgee Heritage Trail - a green way of parks, plazas, and landmarks along the Ocmulgee River in downtown Macon
Bloomfield Park
East Macon Park
Frank Johnson Recreation Center
Freedom Park
L.H. Williams Community School Center
Memorial Park
North Macon Park
Rosa Jackson
Senior Center
John Drew Smith Tennis Center
Tattnall Square Tennis Center
Gateway Park Otis Redding
Central City Park
Central City Skatepark

Government

Prior to 2013, the city government consisted of a mayor and city council. Robert Reichert was elected the first mayor of the consolidated Macon-Bibb County in October 2013. There are also 9 County Commissioners elected from districts within the county.

On March 15, 2019, the U.S. Securities and Exchange Commission charged the former County Manager, Dale M. Walker, with fraud.

Education

Public schools

Bibb County Public School District operates district public schools.

Public high schools include:
 Central High School
 Howard High School
 Northeast Health Science Magnet High School
 Rutland High School
 Southwest Magnet High School and Law Academy
 Westside High School

Georgia Academy for the Blind, operated by the state of Georgia, is a statewide school for blind students.

Also operated by Bibb County Public Schools: 

 Elam Alexander Academy
 Northwoods Academy

Private high schools
 Covenant Academy
 First Presbyterian Day School
 Mount de Sales Academy
 Stratford Academy
 Tattnall Square Academy
 Windsor Academy

State public charter schools
 The Academy for Classical Education
 Cirrus Academy Charter School

Colleges and universities
Approximately 30,000 college students live in the greater Macon area.

 Central Georgia Technical College
 Mercer University
 Middle Georgia State University
 Miller-Motte Technical College - satellite campus
 Wesleyan College

Media

Macon has a substantial number of local television and radio stations. It is also served by two local papers.

Newspapers and magazines
The 11th Hour
Gateway Macon (web portal), The Local's Guide for Things To Do in Macon
Macon Business Journal, a journal chronicling the business community in the Middle Georgia regionMacon Community News, a monthly positive news print newspaperThe Mercer ClusterThe Telegraph, a daily newspaper published in Macon

References in popular culture
The Simpsons
In "Bart on the Road", the Season 7 episode of The Simpsons, character Nelson Muntz suggests the boys take a road trip to Macon. Later he reminds the group that none of their trouble would have happened had they chosen Macon over Knoxville, Tennessee.

Gone with the Wind
In Margaret Mitchell's novel Gone with the Wind, Aunt Pittypat's coachman, Uncle Peter, protected her when she fled to Macon during Sherman's assault on Atlanta.

Baconsfield Park
U.S. Senator Augustus Bacon, of Georgia, in his 1911 will, devised land in Macon in trust, to be used as a public park for the exclusive benefit of white people. The park, known as Baconsfield, was operated in that manner for many years. In Evans v. Newton, the Supreme Court of the United States held that the park could not continue to be operated on a racially discriminatory basis. The Supreme Court of Georgia thereupon declared “that the sole purpose for which the trust was created has become impossible of accomplishment” and remanded the case to the trial court, which held cy-près doctrine to be inapplicable, since the park's segregated character was an essential and inseparable part of Bacon's plan. The trial court ruled that the trust failed and that the property reverted to Bacon's heirs. The Supreme Court of Georgia and the U.S. Supreme Court affirmed. The 50-acre (20 ha) park was lost and commercially developed.

 Telltale's The Walking Dead 
The city of Macon is visited in two different The Walking Dead spinoff games by Telltale Games: The Walking Dead: Season One and The Walking Dead: 400 Days.

In Season One, the city is portrayed as a small rural town and is visited by the main characters as they temporarily set up camp in the city. The city is the hometown of the game's main protagonist and the playable character throughout the game, Lee Everett. He and the other survivors barricade themselves inside his family's pharmacy as they are besieged by zombies. After one of the survivors dies, the group heads to a motel on the outskirts of Macon where they set up camp for two more episodes, before eventually deciding to leave the city for Savannah.

In 400 Days, the city is briefly shown in the episode "Vince's Story" as a flashback to when the episode's main character, Vince, fatally shoots an unseen and unnamed resident of the city before fleeing into the night before the apocalypse began. This murder would ultimately lead to Vince's arrest and the events that occurred at the beginning of the zombie apocalypse.

Infrastructure

Hospitals
 The Medical Center, Navicent Health (a part of Atrium Health)
 Atrium Health Navicent Beverly Knight Olson Children’s Hospital (formerly The Children's Hospital Of Central Georgia)
 Piedmont Health Macon (formerly Coliseum Medical Centers)
 Piedmont Macon Medical Center 
 Piedmont Macon North Hospital
 The American Red Cross of Central Georgia
 Central Georgia Rehabilitation Hospital

Transportation

Airports
Macon Downtown Airport is located near downtown. It has a large number of corporate and private aviation aircraft.
Middle Georgia Regional Airport provides public air service to Macon as well as cargo flights.

Highways
Interstates:
  Interstate 16
   Interstate 75
   Interstate 475
   Interstate 14 (proposed)

U.S. Routes:
  U.S. Route 23
  U.S. Route 41
  U.S. Route 80
  U.S. Route 129

State Routes:
  State Route 11
  State Route 19
  State Route 22
  State Route 49
  State Route 74
  State Route 87
  State Route 87 Connector
  State Route 247
  State Route 401 (unsigned designation for I-75)
  State Route 404 (unsigned designation for I-16)
  State Route 408 (unsigned designation for I-475)
  State Route 540 (Fall Line Freeway)

Mass transit

The Macon Transit Authority (MTA) is Macon's public-transit system, operating the Public Transit City Bus System throughout Macon-Bibb County. As of 2022, the MTA has a total of 10 city bus routes, operating out of the Terminal Station hub.

Intercity bus and rail
Greyhound Lines provides intercity bus service. In 2019, they moved from a stand-alone bus station to the Terminal Station to be in the same hub as the local mass transit busses.

Macon grew as a center of rail transport after the 1846 opening of the Macon and Western Railroad.  Two of the most note-worthy train companies operating through the city were the Central of Georgia Railway and the Southern Railway.  The city continued to be served by passenger trains at Terminal Station until 1971. The Frisco Railroad's Kansas City–Florida Special served the city until 1964. The Southern's Royal Palm ran from Cincinnati, through Macon, to Miami, Florida until 1966. (A truncated route served to Valdosta, Georgia until 1970.) The Central of Georgia's Nancy Hanks ran through Macon, from Atlanta to Savannah until 1971.
Since at least 2006 Macon has been included in the proposed Georgia Rail Passenger Program to restore inter-city rail service but as of 2020, Georgia lacks any inter-city passenger rail service other than the federally funded inter-state Amtrak services. In 2022, Amtrak announced a new fifteen year plan to expand its services, which Macon was included in.

Pedestrians and cycling

Heritage Trail
Ocmulgee Heritage Trail

Notable people

Sister cities
Macon has six sister cities, as designated by Sister Cities International, Inc. (SCI):

  Mâcon, France
  Elmina, Ghana
  Kurobe, Toyama, Japan
  Ulyanovsk, Russia
  Kaohsiung, Taiwan
  Gwacheon, South Korea

See also

 Central Georgia
 Downtown Macon, Georgia
 Macon, Georgia metropolitan area
 List of mayors of Macon, Georgia
 List of U.S. cities with large Black populations
 USS Macon, 3 ships (including 1 airship)

Notes

References

Bibliography

Published in 19th century
 
 
 
 
 
Published in 20th century
 
 
  
 Ida Young, Julius Gholson, and Clara Nell Hargrove. History of Macon, Georgia (Macon, Ga.: Lyon, Marshall & Brooks, 1950).
 John A. Eisterhold. "Commercial, Financial, and Industrial Macon, Georgia, During the 1840s", The Georgia Historical Quarterly, Winter 1969, Vol. 53 Issue 4, pp 424–441
 James H. Stone. "Economic Conditions in Macon, Georgia in the 1830s", The Georgia Historical Quarterly, Summer 1970, Vol. 54 Issue 2, pp 209–225
 Bowling C. Yates. "Macon, Georgia, Inland Trading Center 1826–1836", The Georgia Historical Quarterly, Fall 1971, Vol. 55 Issue 3, pp 365–377
  McInvale, Morton Ray "Macon, Georgia: The War Years, 1861–1865" (Ph.D. dissertation, Florida State University, 1973)
 Roger K. Hux. "The Ku Klux Klan in Macon 1919–1925", The Georgia Historical Quarterly, Summer 1978, Vol. 62 Issue 2, pp 155–168
 Nancy Anderson, Macon: A Pictorial History (Virginia Beach, Va.: Donning, 1979).
 Donnie D. Bellamy. "Macon, Georgia, 1823–1860: A Study in Urban Slavery", Phylon 45 (December 1984): 300–304, 308–309
 Kristina Simms. Macon, Georgia's Central City: An Illustrated History (Chatsworth, Calif.: Windsor, 1989).
 Titus Brown. "Origins of African American Education in Macon, Georgia 1865–1866",  Journal of South Georgia History, Oct 1996, Vol. 11, pp 43–59
 Macon: An Architectural Historical Guide (Macon, Ga.: Middle Georgia Historical Society, 1996).
 Macon's Black Heritage: The Untold Story (Macon, Ga.: Tubman African American Museum, 1997).
 Matthew W. Norman. "James H. Burton and the Confederate States Armory at Macon", The Georgia Historical Quarterly, Winter 1997, Vol. 81 Issue 4, pp 974–987
 Titus Brown. "A New England Missionary and African-American Education in Macon: Raymond G. Von Tobel at the Ballard Normal School, 1908–1935", The Georgia Historical Quarterly, Summer 1998, Vol. 82 Issue 2, pp 283–304
 Robert S. Davis. Cotton, Fire, & Dreams: The Robert Findlay Iron Works and Heavy Industry in Macon, Georgia, 1839–1912 (Macon, Ga., 1998)
 
 

Published in 21st century
 
 
 
 Robert Scott Davis. "A Cotton Kingdom Retooled for War: The Macon Arsenal and the Confederate Ordnance Establishment", The Georgia Historical Quarterly, Fall 2007, Vol. 91 Issue 3, pp 266–291
 Candace Dyer, Street Singers, Soul Shakers, Rebels with a Cause: Music from Macon (Macon, Ga.: Indigo Publishing Group, 2008).
 Mara L. Keire. For Business and Pleasure: Red-Light Districts and the Regulation of Vice in the United States, 1890–1933''  (Johns Hopkins University Press, 2010); 248 pages; History and popular culture of districts in Macon, Ga., and other cities

External links

 Official website
 Macon-Bibb County Convention and Visitors Bureau
 Macon  (the New Georgia Encyclopedia)
 
 
 
 Items related to Macon, various dates (via Digital Public Library of America)
 
 Rees stereograph collection from the Digital Library of Georgia

 
Cities in Bibb County, Georgia
Cities in Georgia (U.S. state)
County seats in Georgia (U.S. state)
Georgia
Cities in Jones County, Georgia
Macon metropolitan area, Georgia
Populated places established in 1823
Consolidated city-counties